John Gravatt may refer to:
 John Segar Gravatt, Virginia lawyer and judge
 John J. Gravatt, American Episcopal bishop